Faith Baptist School (commonly abbreviated "FBS") is a private Christian preschool, elementary school, middle school, and high school located in Salisbury, Wicomico County, Maryland. It is a church school, and enrolls grades K4 through 12th Grade. The school's mascot is the falcon, and its school colors are maroon and gray.

Faith Baptist School is a member school of the Maryland Association of Christian Schools and the American Association of Christian Schools.

History
"Faith Baptist School opened its doors in 1983 with 17 students. Kindergarten through sixth grade were the first grades offered. The school's first administrator, Mark Jago, along with Mrs. Martha Wood, and Mrs. Kim Sterling made up the school's original faculty. Mr. Jago was responsible for choosing the Falcon as the school's mascot as well as the grey and maroon color scheme. In the school's second year its student population doubled. Each successive year following its inception, the school would add a new grade until it reached the full complement it retains today." (written by Chris VanBuskirk)

Historically, FBS students have participated in the community around them, such as local contests, Handbell and Choir Concerts, and other volunteer opportunities. A recent fourth grader placed first in the region for her essay in the Maryland Municipal League "If I Were Mayor" Essay Contest.

Current administration
 Faith Baptist School Board - Deacon Board of Faith Baptist Church and appointed additional members
 School President - Pastor Robert Reinert
 Administrator - Mr. Matthew George

Membership
 American Association of Christian Schools

Affordability
Faith Baptist School, according to The Manna, March 2014, is the most affordable PreK-12th institution in Salisbury.

See also 
 List of high schools in Maryland
 Manna March 2014 including FBS
 School's Listing on Church Exempt List of the Maryland State Department of Education Site 
 School's listing as a member of the Maryland Association of Christian Schools
 School's listing on the American Association of Christian Schools Website

References

External links
 School's Website
 MACS Website
 AACS Website

Christian schools in Maryland
Educational institutions established in 1983
Private middle schools in Maryland
Schools in Wicomico County, Maryland
1983 establishments in Maryland